Euthria boavistensis is a species of sea snail, a marine gastropod mollusk in the family Buccinidae, the true whelks.

Description

Distribution
They are found exclusively in Cape Verde.

References

External links

Buccinidae
Gastropods described in 1982
Gastropods of Cape Verde